Jessie Kerr Lawson (born Janet Kerr Coupar; May 19, 1838 – July 30, 1917 was a Scottish-Canadian writer and poet.

Early life
Lawson was born in St Monans, Fife in 1838. She worked as a schoolteacher, and married William Lawson before moving to Canada in 1866.

Writing
She started writing verse when she was thirteen. The 1890 book One Hundred Modern Scottish Poets: With Biographical and Critical Notices referred to her work as "revealing much fertility of thought and vigour of expression. ... touched with the realism of the true artist." She used several pen-names. She engaged in journalism in Toronto and Dundee, Scotland, and lived her last years in Toronto.

Her work include the poems A Fisher Idyll, Are Oor Folk In, A Queer Auld Toon and The Birth Of Burns. Other work include Dr Bruno's Wife (1893), The Harvest of Moloch (1908) and Lays and Lyrics (1913).

References

Scottish women poets
Canadian women poets
1917 deaths
1838 births
Writers from Edinburgh
19th-century Scottish poets
19th-century Scottish women writers
19th-century Canadian poets
19th-century Canadian women writers
20th-century Scottish poets
20th-century Scottish women writers
20th-century Canadian poets
20th-century Canadian women writers
Scottish emigrants to Canada